Maayan or Ma'ayan can refer to:

Given name
Maayan Amir (born 1978), artist and independent curator
Maayan Davidovich (born 1988), Israeli Olympic windsurfer
Maayan Furman-Shahaf (born 1986), Israeli high jumper and triple jumper
Maayan Strauss (born 1982), Israeli artist
Maayan Sheleff, Israeli independent curator and artist

Surname
Tom Maayan (born 1993), Israeli basketball player in the Israeli National League

Places
Ma'ayan Baruch, a kibbutz in northern Israel
Ma'ayan Tzvi, a kibbutz in northern Israel

Other
Maayan (magazine), an Israeli magazine for poetry, literature, art, and ideas
Maayan (film), a 2001 Tamil drama film
Ma'ayan HaChinuch HaTorani, an education network in Israel

See also
 Mayan (disambiguation)